Gloeocapsopsis is a genus of cyanobacteria belonging to the family Chroococcaceae.

The genus was first described by Geitler ex J. Komárek in 1993.

The genus has cosmopolitan distribution.

Species:
 Gloeocapsopsis crepidinum
 Gloeocapsopsis magma

References

Chroococcales
Cyanobacteria genera